SSDP may refer to:

 Simple Service Discovery Protocol, a networking protocol
 Students for Sensible Drug Policy, an international non-profit advocacy and education organization based in Washington D.C.